The 17th New York State Legislature, consisting of the New York State Senate and the New York State Assembly, met from January 7 to March 27, 1794, during the seventeenth year of George Clinton's governorship, in Albany.

Background
Under the provisions of the New York Constitution of 1777, the State Senators were elected on general tickets in the senatorial districts, and were then divided into four classes. Six senators each drew lots for a term of 1, 2, 3 or 4 years and, beginning at the election in April 1778, every year six Senate seats came up for election to a four-year term. Assemblymen were elected countywide on general tickets to a one-year term, the whole assembly being renewed annually.

In March 1786, the Legislature enacted that future Legislatures meet on the first Tuesday of January of each year unless called earlier by the governor. No general meeting place was determined, leaving it to each Legislature to name the place where to reconvene, and if no place could be agreed upon, the Legislature should meet again where it adjourned.

On February 7, 1791, the Legislature re-apportioned the Senate and Assembly districts, according to the figures of the 1790 United States Census.

State Senator Philip Van Cortlandt was elected in January 1793 to the 3rd United States Congress, leaving a vacancy in the Southern District.

At this time the politicians were divided into two opposing political parties: the Federalists and the Democratic-Republicans.

Elections
The State election was held from April 30 to May 2, 1793. Senator John Cantine (Middle D.) was re-elected. Ezra L'Hommedieu (Southern D.), Jacobus Van Schoonhoven (Western D.), and Assemblymen Reuben Hopkins (Middle D.), Zina Hitchcock (Eastern D.) and Michael Myers (Western D.) were elected to full terms in the Senate. Matthew Clarkson was elected to fill the vacancy in the Southern District.

Sessions
The Legislature met at the Old City Hall in Albany on January 7; and adjourned on March 27, 1794.

On January 7, 1794, John McKesson, Clerk of the Assembly since 1777, was voted out of office. Oliver L. Ker, of New York City, was elected with 37 votes against 21 for McKesson.

State Senate

Districts
The Southern District (8 seats) consisted of Kings, New York, Queens, Richmond, Suffolk and Westchester counties.
The Middle District (6 seats) consisted of Dutchess, Orange and Ulster counties.
The Eastern District (5 seats) consisted of Washington, Clinton, Columbia and Rensselaer counties.
The Western District (5 seats) consisted of Albany, Montgomery, Herkimer, Ontario, Otsego, Saratoga and Tioga counties.

Note: There are now 62 counties in the State of New York. The counties which are not mentioned in this list had not yet been established, or sufficiently organized, the area being included in one or more of the abovementioned counties.

Members
The asterisk (*) denotes members of the previous Legislature who continued in office as members of this Legislature. Reuben Hopkins, Zina Hitchcock, Michael Myers changed from the Assembly to the Senate.

Employees
Clerk: Abraham B. Bancker

State Assembly

Districts

The City and County of Albany (7 seats)
Columbia County (6 seats)
Dutchess County (7 seats)
Herkimer County (1 seat)
Kings County (1 seat)
Montgomery County) (4 seats)
The City and County of New York (7 seats)
Ontario County (1 seat)
Orange County (3 seats)
Otsego County (1 seat)
Queens County (3 seats)
Rensselaer County (5 seats)
Richmond County (1 seat)
Saratoga County (4 seats) 
Suffolk County (4 seats)
Tioga County (1 seat)
Ulster County (5 seats)
Washington and Clinton counties (4 seats)
Westchester County (5 seats)

Note: There are now 62 counties in the State of New York. The counties which are not mentioned in this list had not yet been established, or sufficiently organized, the area being included in one or more of the abovementioned counties.

Assemblymen
The asterisk (*) denotes members of the previous Legislature who continued as members of this Legislature.

Employees
Clerk: Oliver L. Ker
Sergeant-at-Arms: Robert Hunter
Doorkeeper: Jacob Kidney

Notes

Sources
The New York Civil List compiled by Franklin Benjamin Hough (Weed, Parsons and Co., 1858) [see pg. 108 for Senate districts; pg. 115 for senators; pg. 148f for Assembly districts; pg. 167f for assemblymen]
Election result Assembly, Albany Co. at project "A New Nation Votes", compiled by Phil Lampi, hosted by Tufts University Digital Library
Election result Assembly, Dutchess Co. at project "A New Nation Votes"
Election result Assembly, Kings Co. at project "A New Nation Votes"
Election result Assembly, Montgomery Co. at project "A New Nation Votes"
Election result Assembly, Orange Co. at project "A New Nation Votes"
Election result Assembly, Otsego Co. at project "A New Nation Votes"
Election result Assembly, Rensselaer Co. at project "A New Nation Votes"
Election result Assembly, Richmond Co. at project "A New Nation Votes"
Election result Assembly, Saratoga Co. at project "A New Nation Votes"
Election result Assembly, Suffolk Co. at project "A New Nation Votes"
Election result Assembly, Ulster Co. at project "A New Nation Votes"
Election result Assembly, Westchester Co. at project "A New Nation Votes"

1793 in New York (state)
1794 in New York (state)
018